The Bundesstraße 71 (abbr: B 71) is one of the longer German federal roads numbered in the 60s and 70s series. It begins at the B 6 in Bremerhaven by the Unterweser and ends in Könnern near Halle (Saale) in Saxony-Anhalt. To begin with it is one of the east-west links across the Elbe-Weser Triangle and runs in a gentle curve via Bremervörde (48 km, briefly with the B 74) and Zeven (71 km) over the Hansa Line A 1 (83 km) to the district town of Rotenburg (Wümme) (97 km). Here it crosses the B 75 and continues past the Lüneburg Heath to Soltau (133 km), where it crosses the B 3. Carrying on towards the east it runs through heathland to Uelzen (190 km), where the road again crosses another major federal route, the B 4. Next it runs through the Elbufer-Drawehn Nature Park and crosses the old Inner German Border and present-day state border between Lower Saxony and Saxony-Anhalt at kilometre marker 222.

In Salzwedel (233 km the B 71 leaves the Wendland to the left and swings southeast. In the Altmark it passes through villages and sparsely populated heathland. At Gardelegen it meets the B 188. After Gardelegen it heads south passing for 30 km through the Colbitz-Letzlingen Heath. After 335 km the B 71 enters Magdeburg, where it crosses the A 14, A 2 and B 1, and passes through the old cathedral city in a north-south direction as part of the Magdeburg Ring. Next it runs on for 56 km as the Romanesque Road (Straße der Romanik) through the heart of the Anhalt country until, at Könnern, it meets and joins the B 6 again, the road it left at Bremerhaven, 26 km before Halle, the largest city in Sachsen-Anhalt.

The whole route is 391 km long.

See also 
 List of federal highways in Germany

References 

071
B071
B071
B071